S. Muniraju is an Indian politician from the state of Karnataka. He was a two-term member of the Karnataka Legislative Assembly.
He was elected as BJP president for Bangalore Urban District for a second consecutive term.

Political Party
S. Muniraju's party is the Bharatiya Janata Party.

References 

Karnataka MLAs 2008–2013
Living people
Bharatiya Janata Party politicians from Karnataka
Year of birth missing (living people)